Ahmose-ankh was a prince during the early Eighteenth dynasty of Egypt. He was the son of Pharaoh Ahmose I and Queen Ahmose Nefertari. He was the crown prince but pre-deceased his father, thus the next pharaoh was his younger brother Amenhotep I. His sister was Ahmose-Meritamun.

A stela which depicts him with his parents is now in the Luxor Museum.

Sources
Aidan Dodson & Dyan Hilton: The Complete Royal Families of Ancient Egypt. Thames & Hudson, 2004, p. 129

Princes of the Eighteenth Dynasty of Egypt
Heirs to the ancient Egyptian throne
16th-century BC Egyptian people
Children of Ahmose I
Heirs apparent who never acceded